Guk-ppong is a derogatory Korean word that is used to pejoratively describe a Korean nationalist. The word is made up of the Korean word “guk” (Korean: 국), which means country, and “pon” which is believed to have originated from the word “philopon” (Japanese: 覚醒剤), which is a Japanese slang for the drug Methamphetamine. As a result, the word literally means “intoxicated with nationalism”.

The word is often used to call out nationalists who are overly patriotic and bring in negative attention towards Korea.

History
The term was first used in DC Inside, a South Korean imageboard. The ultranationalists would excessively ask foreigners questions about Korean culture. For example, "Do you know Psy?", "Do you know kimchi?" Many users believed that these actions were excessive and rather ironically humiliating to Korea. So, in means of insulting the ultranationalists, users developed the word, "guk-ppong," and began replying to nationalist posts, such as the ones mentioned above, with the word.

Shortly after guk-ppong's creation, the term ''Guk-kka'' also began to appear. The word is the exact opposite of guk-ppong, being used to describe Koreans who are rather unproud and disloyal to South Korea. Guk-kkas are known for their frequent posting of the phrase, ‘Ddong song hap ni da’ (Korean: 똥송합니다), which roughly transliterates to “I am sorry that I am Asian." Similarly to guk-ppong, DC Inside's users began replying to anti-Korean posts with guk-kka.

Effects

Social effects
"Guk-ppong's" social effects show an act of emphasising and encouraging unconditional patriotism. On the contrary, there are tendencies to criticise and discredit these patriotic elements. In fact,speech of president Park Geun-hye on the independence day of 2016 was also criticised as "'Guk-ppong' speech that is drunk with patriotism." The Japanese media Nikkei reported that intellectuals and media who warn young people from using new internet phrases criticising their homeland are increasing. Sociologists say "Guk-ppong" is not a pride, but an exaggeration to conceal the sense of inferiority and anxiety. Director Ryu Seung-wan ,who directed <군함도>, commented related with the word "Guk-ppong" : “I wanted to be judged only by the movie, but I couldn't do it with Korean sentiment. In the movie, it is possible that the two sides are simultaneously engaged in "Guk-ppong", pro-Japanese."

Cultural influences
A film based on history cannot avoid controversy over the "Guk-ppong" and the distortion of history.Now a "blackout galley" following the merge with the "Hell-Chosun gallery" in "DC inside", the "Guk-ppong gallery" was opened on September 4, 2015, following the establishment of a "gallery of Hell-chosun". Guk-ppong Content is consumed entirely in the form of people enjoying culture. Modern and contemporary history is shunned by the younger generation as Guk-ppong deprives nationalism and patriotism. Additionally, famous South Korean history instructors, such as Seol Min-seok and Choi Jin-ki, have stirred up in broadcasting and education circles, under the criticism of the "Guk-ppong" missionaries.

Criticism
Some make the critique that excessive nationalism is causing excessive national attention that is the enlargement of Korean culture patriotism crying out "Aunt, Please give me a plate of skate!" speaking with a broad accent in front of the camera. Also in the golden age of history, Some point out that the desire for great ancient history is blatant without distinct of conservatism and progressivism, ruling party and opposition party. Because the reality surrounding us is so hot, everyone is going to leave the country in history. Song Joong-ki said, "Actually, I don't think the meaning of the word Guk-ppong is accurately established. Many people were confused with the words of appealing to pity. Don't blindly follow what is unrighteous, but I don't know why they shouldn't love South Korea. I think it could be connected to that. If I get the right criticism, I'll be able to talk, but I'm not afraid if I have right thinking."

President Park's government exerted political pressure on  cultural and artistic circles for private gain in the 2016 South Korean political scandal.

See also
 Korean ethnic nationalism
 K-Quarantine
 Korean claim to Tsushima Island

References

South Korean culture
Korean words and phrases
Korean nationalism
Korean slang
Internet slang
Pejorative terms for people